The Donkey's Hide is a 1982 Soviet fantasy film based on Charles Perrault's Donkeyskin. Participant of the KinderFilmFest program at the 1985 Berlin International Film Festival.

Plot
A bunch of paintings come to life and one of them proceeds to tell the story.  A princess ran away from her courtly life, disguising herself in the skin of a donkey that excreted gold coins.  When a prince sees her dressed like a princess, he tries to find out who she is.

Cast
Vladimir Etush: King Gaston IX
Svetlana Nemolyaeva: Queen Gorgette
Vera Novikova: Princess Theresa
Aleksandr Galibin: Prince Jacques
Zinoviy Gerdt: Poet Laureate to King Gaston IX
Tatyana Pelttser: Wicked Fairy
Valentina Panina: Good Fairy
Nikolai Karachentsov: Robber Burabo
Lyudmila Makarova: Madame Burabo
Sergei Parshin: Redhead
Boris Arakelov: Gendarme
Aleksandr Domashov: Dandy
Sergey Filippov: Courtier
Sergei Ivanov: Courtier
Mariya Barabanova: Blind Old Woman

References

External links

1982 films
Films based on fairy tales
Films based on works by Charles Perrault
Soviet fantasy films
Films directed by Nadezhda Kosheverova